This is a list of Mandé peoples of Africa.

The predominant countries of each group's residence are shown in bold and are italicised. 
Manding (whose languages are in the Manding languages group of Mande)
Bambara people (Mali, Burkina Faso, Senegal, Niger)
Bozo people (Mali)
Dyula people (Mali, Burkina Faso, Côte d'Ivoire, Ghana, Guinea)
Mandinka people (Mali, Guinea, Senegal, Guinea-Bissau, Sierra Leone, The Gambia)
Mandingo people (Sierra Leone, Guinea, Liberia)
Susu people (Guinea, Sierra Leone)
Yalunka people (Guinea, Sierra Leone, Senegal, Mali)
Bafour people (Senegal, Mali) (Extinct: ancestors of present day Soninke and other Mandé groups)
Banka people (Mali)
Beng people (Côte d'Ivoire)
Bissa people (Burkina Faso, Ghana, Togo)
Bobo people (Burkina Faso, Mali)
Boko people (Benin, Nigeria)
Busa people (Nigeria)
Duun people (Mali, Burkina Faso)
Gban people (Côte d'Ivoire)
Gbandi people (Liberia, Guinea)
Gio people (Côte d'Ivoire, Liberia)
Goo people (Côte d'Ivoire)
Guro people (Côte d'Ivoire)
Jakhanke people (Guinea, Senegal, The Gambia, Mali)
Jeri people (Côte d'Ivoire, Burkina Faso)
Jowulu people (Mali)
Kakabe people (Guinea)
Kissi people (Guinea, Liberia, Sierra Leone)
Kono people (Sierra Leone)
Kpee people (Burkina Faso)
Kpelle people (Sierra Leone, Liberia)
Kuranko people (Sierra Leone, Guinea)
Kyenga people (Nigeria, Benin)
Lele people (Guinea)
Ligbi people (Ghana)
Loko people (Sierra Leone)
Loma people (Guinea, Liberia)
Mano people (Liberia)
Mende people (Sierra Leone, Liberia)
Mikhifore people (Guinea)
Mwan people (Côte d'Ivoire)
Samo people (Burkina Faso)
Seenku people (Burkina Faso)
Shangawa people(Nigeria)
Soninke people (Mali, Mauritania, Senegal, Gambia, Guinea, Côte d'Ivoire, Ghana)
Soninke Wangara (Mali, Burkina Faso, Côte d'Ivoire, Ghana) (Extinct: sub-group of the Soninke)
Tura people (Côte d'Ivoire)
Vai people (Liberia, Sierra Leone)
Wan people (Côte d'Ivoire)
Yaure people (Côte d'Ivoire)
Zialo people (Guinea'')

References

Mandé people